The State Register of Heritage Places is maintained by the Heritage Council of Western Australia. , 144 places are heritage-listed in the Shire of Broome, of which 51 are on the State Register of Heritage Places.

List
The Western Australian State Register of Heritage Places, lists the following 51 state registered places within the Shire of Broome:

Notes

 A search for Broome LGA returns 360 hits, of which 216 are for the Broomehill-Tambellup LGA, 144 for Broome LGA and one for Wyndham-East Kimberley LGA
 A search for Broome LGA returns 56 hits, of which five are for the Broomehill-Tambellup LGA and 51 for Broome LGA
 No coordinates specified by Inherit database

References

Broome
 
Broome